Mary Beisiegel is an Associate Professor of Mathematics at Oregon State University. Her research is in math education.

Education and career

Beisiegel received her PhD in Mathematics from the University of Alberta in 2009. Her dissertation, Being (Almost) a Mathematician: Teacher Identity Formation in Post-Secondary Mathematics, was supervised by Elaine Simmt, David Pimm, and Terrance Ronald Carson.  She received two new National Science Foundation grants, both in 2020.

Awards and honors

Beisiegel received the Mathematical Association of America's Henry L. Adler Award in 2017.

References 

Year of birth missing (living people)
Living people
Canadian mathematicians
Canadian women mathematicians
Mathematics educators
University of Alberta alumni
Oregon State University faculty